The Brawling Brutes is a professional wrestling stable consisting of Sheamus, who serves as its leader, Ridge Holland, Butch, and Drew McIntyre. They currently perform in WWE on the SmackDown brand.

History 
During the 2021 WWE Draft, Holland was drafted from NXT to SmackDown. On 5 November episode of SmackDown, during a backstage interview, Holland referred to Sheamus as his idol. On 19 November episode of SmackDown, Holland helped Sheamus defeat Cesaro, Ricochet, and Jinder Mahal in a four-way match, starting an alliance between the two. On 1 January 2022 at Day 1, Holland would team with Sheamus to defeat Cesaro and Ricochet, however, during the match, Holland would suffer a broken nose and would be removed mid-match.

In March, they would enter a feud with The New Day, where on the 11 March episode of SmackDown, Sheamus and Holland introduced Butch as part of their stable. According to Sheamus, he found Butch in pub's in Ireland, who had previously been stablemates with Holland in the Kings of NXT, under his previous ring name Pete Dunne. After an overhead belly-to-belly suplex by Holland on Big E legitimately broke the latter's neck, Big E was promptly removed from the rivalry, leaving only Kofi Kingston and Xavier Woods. On Night 2 of WrestleMania 38, Holland and Sheamus defeated Kingston and Woods in a tag-team match.

On the 19 August episode of SmackDown, Sheamus won a fatal five-way match, earning a match against Gunther for the Intercontinental Championship at Clash at the Castle. The following week on SmackDown, Sheamus and Gunther had a confrontation, in which Sheamus and Gunther's respective allies, Butch and Ludwig Kaiser, engaged in a brawl while Sheamus and Gunther remained motionless, staring each other down, and eventually started a slow face turn for their stable. At Clash at the Castle, Sheamus lost to Gunther, but received a standing ovation from the Cardiff crowd in a critically acclaimed 5-star match according to Dave Meltzer's Wrestling Observer Newsletter, cementing the stable's face turn. On the 23 September episode of SmackDown, Holland and Butch faced The Usos for the Undisputed WWE Tag Team Championship but were  unsuccessful after interference from Imperium, then on the 4 October episode of NXT faced Pretty Deadly for the NXT Tag Team Championship in a losing effort after interference from  Imperium. Four days later at Extreme Rules, The Brawling Brutes defeated Imperium in a six-man tag team Good Old Fashioned Donnybrook match. After defeating The Bloodline's Sami Zayn and Solo Sikoa in a tag team match, Holland and Butch received another opportunity against The Usos at Crown Jewel where they failed to win the titles. Three weeks later at Survivor Series WarGames on 26 November, The Brawling Brutes along with Drew McIntyre and Kevin Owens lost to The Bloodline in a WarGames match.After regaining each other's respect at Wargames, Sheamus and Drew McIntyre reformed their on-again-off-again tag team, which they jokingly referred to by the suggestive name, "The Banger Brothers", leading to McIntyre becoming an ally and member of the Brutes.

References 

WWE teams and stables